The Carlos Palanca Memorial Awards for Literature winners in the year 1995 (rank, title of winning entry, name of author).

English division

Short story
First prize: The Apartment by Clinton Palanca
Second prize: Blood by Noelle De Jesus
Third prize: I See My Shadow on the Pavement by Lakambini A. Sitoy

Short story for children
First prize: Pan de Sal Saves the Day by Norma Olizon-Chikiamco
Second prize: Little Star by Mary Ann Tobias
Third prize: The Quarreling Kites by Erlinda Acacio Flores

Poetry
First prize: Katipunera and Other Poems by Elsa Martinez Coscolluela
Second prize: In the Ritual of Calling and Other Poems by Ma. Luisa A. Igloria
Third prize: Amina Among the Angels and Other Poems by Merlie Alunan

Essay
First prize: For a Pair of Red Tsinelas/Child of the River Dreams by Susan T. Layug
Second prize: No More Sweet Wild Garden by Edmund Coronel
Third prize: In Paris by Clinton Palanca

Full-length play
First prize: Sakurahime or the Princess of the Cherry Blossoms by Anton Juan Jr.

Filipino division

Short story for children
First prize: Papel de Liha by Ma. Corazon Paulina Remegio
Second prize: Blip by Rene O. Villanueva
Third prize: Ang Mga Tsismis sa Baryo Silid by Ronaldo L. Carcamo; Isang Kuwentong Ulap by Natasha Vizcarra; and Sapagkat ang Special Children ay Bahagi rin ng Lipunan at Mundo by Fanny A. Garcia
Honorable mention: Ms. Serena Serenata by Merlinda Bobis; and The Flathouse Roof by Jose Victor Z. Torres

Poetry
First prize: Bayan ng Lunggati, Bayan ng Pighati by Ruth Elynia S. Mabanglo
Second prize: Tinatawag Nila Akong Makata by Vivian Limpin
Third prize: Mga Larawang Pisikal at Iba pang Tula by Lilia Quindoza Santiago

Essay
First prize: Lakambini: Mula Duyong Hanggang Gunita by Eli Rueda Guieb III
Second prize: Ganito Kami Noon, Ganito Pa Rin Kami Ngayon by Buenaventura S. Medina Jr.
Third prize: Humabi ng mga Salita, Saksihan ang Hiwaga by Edmund Coronel

One-Act play
First prize: Dalawang Bayani by Amelia L.Bonifacio
Second prize: Sulambi by Sunnie Noel
Third prize: Sandaling Tagpo by Jose Victor Z. Torres

Full-length play
First prize: Matrimonyal by Lito Casaje
Second prize: 1896 by Carlos Dela Paz Jr.
Third prize: Bintao by Rene O. Villanueva; and Exodo by Rodolfo R. Lana Jr.

Teleplay
First prize: Plebo by Mes De Guzman
Second prize: Siyasat by Eli Rueda Guieb III
Third prize: Ang Lalaki sa Bubong by Mes De Guzman

Screenplay
First prize: Karinyo-brutal by Rodolfo R. Lana Jr.
Second prize: Kalapati by Rolando S. Tinio
Third prize: Kapag Umawit ang Sirena by Lore Reyes; and Ninoy by Rosauro Dela Cruz

References
 

Palanca Awards
Palanca Awards, 1995